Düren station is located to the north of the centre of Düren and is the largest station in the city and the district of Düren. It is located at the intersection of the Cologne–Aachen high-speed line with the lines to  Linnich, Heimbach and Euskirchen.  Until 1992 it was also connected to the Erft Railway.

The train is served by Regional-Express, Regionalbahn and S-Bahn trains. It is the terminus of line S19 Rhine-Ruhr S-Bahn. The station was opened on 1 September 1841 by the Rhenish Railway Company on its original line from Cologne to Belgium.

History 

Düren station was established on 1 September 1841 with the opening of the Aachen–Düren–Cologne line. The station became more and more important during the period of industrialisation. This resulted in the opening of the following lines:

Due to its ever-improving accessibility Düren was served by increasing numbers of express trains on the various lines. Thus, there were express trains via Euskirchen to Bonn and via Bedburg and Neuss to Düsseldorf.

A depot for the maintenance of locomotives was also built at Düren. It was originally located immediately next to the station. The construction took about three years and it became operational in 1933.

Unlike the rest of Düren, which was destroyed by the attacks of the Allies, the station was largely unscathed by World War II. During the war, the engine depot was badly damaged and it was only partially rebuilt after the war. Consequently, Düren depot lost its importance.

Post-war

The great destruction of Düren during World War II reduced the city's financial resources. Decades old plans for remodelling the tracks and the construction of a new station building were therefore not implemented. Nevertheless, on 15 May 1949, D-Züge (express trains operated using coaches with corridors) began serving Düren station again. There were two express services: one from Brussels via Aachen, Cologne and Wiesbaden to Frankfurt, the second from Aachen via Cologne, Wiesbaden, Heidelberg, Stuttgart and Ulm to Munich. Thus, it was possible to travel from Düren without changing at Cologne or Aachen.

Following a significant fall in freight traffic, Düren depot closed on 1 July 1986 and was demolished three years later. As a result, Düren became a hub almost entirely for passenger services with little freight transport. In the next few decades, an increasing number of fast services stopped in Düren, including InterCity, InterRegio, EuroCity and night trains.

The period of fast services ended with the modernisation of the line in the early 21st century. In December 2002, the last D-Züge on the Cologne–Ostend route and the last night train on the Aachen–Dresden route were abandoned. A year later, the InterCity and night train lines were also modified so that Düren was no longer served by long-distance services. The station was also downgraded to a category 4 station.

The mayor of Düren unsuccessfully tried to get Intercity-Express and Thalys high speed trains on the Aachen–Cologne line to stop at Düren. Deutsche Bahn agreed, however, that the station would be upgraded to category 3 as soon as InterCity or night trains returned to the Aachen-Cologne line.

The upgrading of the Aachen–Düren–Cologne line and the related establishment of a S-Bahn line from Düren to Cologne led to a renewed increase in the importance of the Düren node. However, the Düren–Bedburg line was dismantled, the Düren–Euskirchen line was closed and the Düren–Jülich–Linnich and the Düren–Heimbach lines were sold to the Dürener Kreisbahn (Düren District Railway, DKB). Passenger and freight traffic on the latter lines was subsequently revitalised by the DKB. These services are now operated by Rurtalbahn.

The station building has been preserved until today. With the development of the high-speed line between Cologne and Aachen, Düren station was partially restored and completely modernised. The tracks and platforms were renewed and later the station building was renovated and modernised in stages. During the first stage of the upgrading of the Cologne–Düren line the platforms were all remodelled and upgraded to make them accessible by the disabled. The entrance to the station from Cologne was rebuilt for a top speed of 160 km/h. During the second stage tracks 1 and 2 will be upgraded for 200 km/h operations.

Service at the station 
The station is fully accessible with lifts available at all platforms. There are also guidelines on the ground for the blind. Services are available in the station building, including a ticket office, a bookstore, a bank, toilets, lockers and a DB-Service Store. The station also has a Bahnhofsmission (a charity that gives assistance of various sorts at German stations). At the southern exit to the station is a subway to the newly built bicycle parking, which was opened in September 2010 after several months of construction.

References

External links

Railway stations in North Rhine-Westphalia
S13 (Rhine-Ruhr S-Bahn)
Rhine-Ruhr S-Bahn stations
Railway stations in Germany opened in 1841
Buildings and structures in Düren (district)